The following radio stations broadcast on AM frequency 910 kHz: 910 AM is a regional broadcast frequency. See also List of broadcast station classes.

Argentina
 LR5 La Red in Buenos Aires
 LRA23 in San Juan

Canada
 CKDQ in Drumheller, Alberta - 50 kW, transmitter located at

Costa Rica
TIUM at San Jose

Mexico
  in Mexicali, Baja California

United States

References

Lists of radio stations by frequency